The commune of Kirundo is a commune of Kirundo Province in northern Burundi. The capital lies at Kirundo.

References

Communes of Burundi
Kirundo Province